Hawaiian pizza is a pizza originating in Canada, and is traditionally topped with pineapple, tomato sauce, cheese, and either ham or bacon.

History
Sam Panopoulos, a Greek-born Canadian, created the first Hawaiian pizza at the Satellite Restaurant in Chatham, Ontario, Canada in 1962. Inspired in part by his experience preparing Chinese dishes which commonly mix sweet and savory flavours, Panopoulos experimented with adding pineapple, ham, bacon, and other toppings. These additions were not initially very popular.

The addition of pineapple to the traditional mix of tomato sauce and cheese, along with either ham or bacon, later became popular locally and eventually became a staple offering of pizzerias on a global scale. The name of this creation is, in fact, actually not directly inspired by the U.S. state of Hawaii at all; Panopoulos chose the name Hawaiian after the brand of canned pineapple they were using at the time.

In Germany, Hawaiian pizza is thought to be a variation of the ham, pineapple and cheese-topped Toast Hawaii, originally introduced by Germany's first TV cook Clemens Wilmenrod in 1955. In 1957, a "Hawaiian Pizza" containing pineapple, papaya, and chopped green pepper, but not ham or bacon, appeared in Portland, Oregon.
A 1960 episode of The Adventures of Rocky and Bullwinkle and Friends contained a reference to "Pineapple Pizza."

A blend of cheeses, usually consisting of mozzarella cheese is a popular topping on Hawaiian pizza. In the United States, some restaurants use barbecue sauce and pulled pork with pineapple and cheese as an alternative to the more traditional combination featuring tomato sauce and either ham or bacon.

In popular media
In 2014, Time listed Hawaiian pizza first on its list of "The 13 Most Influential Pizzas of All Time". Opinions towards Hawaiian pizza are generally divisive and polarizing. Although many enjoy the taste, others vehemently dislike it, possibly due to the sweetness of pineapple paired with "salty pizza ingredients."

In 2017, Icelandic president Guðni Th. Jóhannesson reportedly told a group of high school students during a Q&A that he was fundamentally opposed to putting pineapple on pizza. He jokingly added that he would ban pineapple as a pizza topping if he could, as long as he received 30% of the under 21 vote. His off-the-cuff remark generated a flurry of media coverage and inspired many, regardless of their taste for Hawaiian pizza, to express their opinions on social media. Celebrities shared their liking or distaste for Hawaiian pizza, including Canada's prime minister, Justin Trudeau, who expressed support for it by tweeting: "I have a pineapple. I have a pizza. And I stand behind this delicious Southwestern Ontario creation." Panopoulos, at that point retired from the restaurant business, was called upon by some media outlets to defend his creation.

Guðni later clarified that he was only joking, and that he did not have the power to ban particular toppings on pizza; he added that even he would not like to live in a country where the leader could ban anything that they did not like.

American author John Green reflected on the dish's cosmopolitan origins and reach, noting its Canadian invention by a Greek immigrant, inspired by Chinese cuisine to put a South American fruit on an Italian dish, which has gained its greatest popularity in Australia.

Surveys
Hawaiian was the most popular pizza in Australia in 1999, accounting for 15% of pizza sales.

A 2015 review of independent UK takeaways operating through Just Eat found the Hawaiian pizza to be the most commonly available. A 2016 Harris Poll survey of US adults had pineapple in the top three least-favorite pizza toppings, ahead of anchovies and mushrooms.

According to a 2019 YouGov Omnibus survey, 12% of Americans who eat pizza say that pineapple is one of their top three favorite pizza toppings, and 24% say that pineapple is one of their least favorite toppings. It was not the most disliked topping, however, as other ingredients were even more widely unpopular in the survey: anchovies and eggplant.

See also

 List of pizza varieties by country
 List of Canadian inventions and discoveries
 Pizza in Canada
 Canadian cuisine

References

External links
 

Pizza varieties
Australian cuisine
Canadian cuisine
Hawaiian fusion cuisine
Food and drink introduced in 1962
Ham dishes
Pineapple dishes
Food combinations
1962 establishments in Canada